The term turkey call can refer to either the different vocalizations of the turkey or devices designed and used to imitate these sounds.

Vocalizations of wild turkeys include "gubles", "clucks", "putts", "purrs", "yelps", "cutts", "cackles", "kee-kees" and the coveted French call "glouglou".

To reproduce these different vocalizations there are various types of turkey calls available today and a good hunter learns to use several because it is unpredictable which type of sound a wild turkey will respond to on any given time. The hunter will learn turkey call techniques to attract a turkey to their location.

Turkey box calls
Box calls create turkey sounds with the friction created by sliding the lid across the surface of the box. Box calls are convenient and are capable of producing more volume than any other call in the world.

Turkey pot calls
Pot calls may be the most common turkey calls because they are easy to use and create lifelike turkey sounds. Friction calls feature a round (usually) surface, and the user creates sound by drawing a peg, or "striker", across the surface. Pot call surfaces can be slate, aluminum, glass or a variety of other materials.

Push-pull turkey calls
Push-pull turkey calls are the simplest of all turkey calls to use, and create realistic turkey sounds. A push-pull call functions by pushing and/or pulling a button on the end of the call, forcing a surface across a peg.

Tube turkey calls
The tube call is a popular caller for many of the nation's top turkey hunters. With it, a hunter can make virtually any sound in a turkey's vocabulary from yelps to purrs to gobbles.  
Tube calls consist of a small hollow barrel with latex fixed across half of the top with an elastic band.

Wingbone turkey calls
Wingbone calls originally were made from the wingbones of a turkey, and some still are. They are a suction-type call. Sounds are made with quick, forceful sucking motions, much like kissing the end of the call. Good wingbone calls make a hollow sounding yelp.

Diaphragm turkey calls
Diaphragm calls are inserted entirely in the user's mouth and require years of practice to learn to use them correctly.

Turkey locator calls
Locators are calls used to force a tom turkey to gobble, thus giving away his location. Mature male turkeys will "shock gobble" at loud noises such as an owl's hoot, a crow's caw, a hawk's scream, a peahen's call, a rock bouncing off a stop sign, - even thunder or a train's whistle.

References

Meleagris
Bird sounds